Temirkan Romanovich Sundukov (born 17 September 2001) is a Russian football player. He plays for FC Dynamo Makhachkala.

Club career
He made his debut in the Russian Professional Football League for PFC Spartak Nalchik on 16 July 2019 in a game against FC Anzhi Makhachkala. He made his Russian Football National League debut for FC Torpedo Moscow on 17 October 2020 in a game against FC Neftekhimik Nizhnekamsk.

References

External links
Profile by Russian Professional Football League
 Profile by Football National League

2001 births
Living people
Russian footballers
Association football defenders
PFC Spartak Nalchik players
FC Torpedo Moscow players
FC Dynamo Makhachkala players
Russian First League players
Russian Second League players